In heraldic achievements, the helmet or helm is situated above the shield and bears the torse and crest. The style of helmet displayed varies according to rank and social status, and these styles developed over time, in step with the development of actual military helmets. In some traditions, especially German and Nordic heraldry, two or three helmets (and sometimes more) may be used in a single achievement of arms, each representing a fief to which the bearer has a right.  For this reason, the helmets and crests in German and Nordic arms are considered to be essential to the coat of arms and are never separated from it.

Open-visored or barred helmets are typically reserved to the highest ranks of nobility, while lesser nobility and burghers typically assume closed helms. While these classifications remained relatively constant, the specific forms of all these helmets varied and evolved over time. 

In ecclesiastical heraldry, bishops and other clergy use a mitre or other rank-appropriate ecclesiastical hat in place of a helmet.

History

The evolution of heraldic helmet shaped followed the evolution of helmet design, especially jousting helmets, from the 14th to 16th centuries. The armorials of the second half of the 13th century do not include helmets. Helmets are shown as integral part of coats of in the first half of the  14th century (Codex Manesse, Zürich armorial). These  helmets are still of the "great helm" type, without movable visor. Heraldic helmets become diversified with the development of dedicated jousting armour during the 15th and 16th century. The development is halted with the abandonment of jousting as a courtly practice, in the early years of the 17th century. From that period, the various types of heraldic helmet are purely driven by convention, and no longer tied to improvements  or fashions in armoury.

The practice of indicating rank through the display of barred or open-face helmets appears around 1615. 
As jousting with lances was supplanted by tourneying with maces, the object being to knock the opponent's crest off his helmet, the fully enclosed helmet gave way to helmets with enlarged visual openings with only a few bars to protect the face. These barred helmets were restricted by the imperial chancellery in Vienna to the nobility and certain doctors of law or theology, while the jousting helm was freely adopted by anyone. 

The direction a helmet faces and the number of bars on the grille have been ascribed special significance in later manuals, but this is not a period practice. A king's helmet, a golden helmet shown affronté with the visor raised, crowned with a royal crown, became adopted by the kings of Prussia. 

Historically, the helmet was not specifically granted in an achievement of arms, but was naturally assumed by appropriate rank as a matter of "inherent right", so a helmet with torse and mantling would not be misplaced even above a shield which had no crest to place above it. When multiple crests need to be depicted, the convention  in English heraldry is to draw the crests above a single helmet, each being separated from it, while in German heraldry, where multiple crests appear frequently after the 16th century, each crest is always treated as inseparable from its own helmet and turned in agreement with the helmet. 

In continental Europe, multiple helmets were usually turned inward, with the center helm (if an odd number) turned affronté; while in Scandinavian heraldry the helmets were usually turned outward. 
Heraldic combinations were driven to extremes in the 18th century, e.g. the  arms of the last margraves of Brandenburg-Ansbach (Charles Alexander, Margrave of Brandenburg-Ansbach, r. 1737–1791) consist of a shield with 21 quarterings topped with a record thirteen helmets and crests.

By traditions

General

United Kingdom
The usage of heraldic helmets in Britain is as follows: gold helmet with bars for the royal family; silver helmet with gold bars for peers; steel helmet with gold bars for the non-peerage Scottish feudal baron; open steel helmet shown affronté  for knights and baronets; steel tournament helm for Scottish clan chiefs; closed steel helmet for esquires and gentlemen.

Russia 
The norms of Russian heraldry regarding helmets diverge greatly from the Western European tradition. Alongside the traditional Western open helmet (silver with gold details for titled nobility, steel with gold details for everyone else), as well as the closed helmet sometimes granted by the state, "ethnic" helmets were also in use, not found anywhere else. These followed their own colour system, not corresponding with the use of tinctures for Western helmets: non-titled nobles would use a steel yerikhonka with silver details, barons and counts steel with golden details, knyaz families silver with golden details.

In the modern Russian Federation, the Russian Heraldic Council allows both Western and ethnic helmets (called sheloms in modern Russian heraldic language), but only in their simplest forms, and stripped of any details that may be perceived as symbols of nobility. For Western helmets, this means using commoner kettle hats as opposed to the more aristocratic open and close helmets, while sheloms are to be used without nasal bars, cheekpieces or neck guards, which were sometimes found on older "ethnic" helmets. On the other hand, a commoner helmet may be complemented with a mail coif below. All colours except for steel are forbidden, with the exception of the lining, for which other tinctures may be used (purpure is recommended). However, none of these restrictions apply to direct descendants of old Russian aristocracy, who can use the same helmets as their ancestors alongside the rest of their family arms.  

Both in Imperial and republican Russian heraldry, the direction of the helmet plays no role: whether the helmet is portrayed affronty or turned to the right depends on the shape of the crest.

Canada
In Canadian heraldry, helmets play little role and are not blazoned; therefore, the armiger can display their helm in whatever style they choose. One notable example of a non-traditional helmet used in Canadian heraldry is the arms of Julie Payette, a former governor general of Canada, which bears an astronaut's helmet as the helm. Other examples include nasal helmets, Corinthian helmets, parka hoods, and United Nations peacekeeping helmets.

Belgium
In Belgian heraldry, barred helms are most commonly used, and are not reserved for the nobility like in some jurisdictions. They most often have gold bars, as well as a gold collar and trim. They are often lined and attached.

Ecclesiastical 
In the Roman Catholic Church, clerics entitled to a coat of arms use a galero instead of a helmet, which is considered too belligerent for men in holy orders.

In the same way, clerics of the Anglican Communion entitled to a coat of arms use a similar black hat in place of a helmet.

Notes

References

External devices in achievements
Headgear in heraldry
Helmets